Carex arenicola is a species of sedge first described by Friedrich Schmidt. It is native to eastern Russia and China, the Korean Peninsula, and Japan.

References

arenicola
Flora of Asia